The Barcelona chair is a chair designed by Ludwig Mies van der Rohe and Lilly Reich, for the German Pavilion at the International Exposition of 1929, hosted by Barcelona, Catalonia, Spain.

The chair was first used in Villa Tugendhat, a private residence, designed by Mies in Brno (Czech Republic).

Materials and manufacture
The frame was initially designed to be bolted together but was redesigned in 1950 using stainless steel, which allowed the frame to be formed by a seamless piece of metal, giving it a smoother appearance.  Bovine leather replaced the ivory-colored pigskin which was used for the original pieces.

Philosophy and ergonomics
Although many architects and furniture designers of the Bauhaus era were intent on providing well-designed homes and impeccably manufactured furnishings for the "common man," the Barcelona chair was an exception. It was designed for the Spanish Royalty to oversee the opening ceremonies of the exhibition and was described by Time magazine as inhabiting "his sumptuous German pavilion." The form is thought to be extrapolated from Roman folding chairs known as the Curule chair  upholstered stools used by Roman aristocracy. According to Knoll Inc., despite its industrial appearance the Barcelona chair requires much hand craftsmanship.

Current production
Since 1953 Knoll Inc has manufactured the Barcelona chair in both chrome and stainless steel. The chairs are almost completely hand-crafted, and each carries a facsimile of van der Rohe's signature, stamped into its frame. 

Unlicensed replicas of the original design are made by other manufacturers worldwide and are sold under different marketing names. Such designs are frequently subject to legal challenges.

In popular culture
In his 1981 book about modern architecture, From Bauhaus to Our House, Tom Wolfe called the Barcelona chair as "the Platonic ideal of the chair", and wrote that, despite its high price, owning one had become a necessity for young architects: "When you saw the holy object on the sisal rug, you knew you were in a household where a fledgling architect and his young wife had sacrificed everything to bring the symbol of the godly mission into their home."

On the cover of the fifth volume of Spy × Family, the character Yuri Briar is shown sitting on a Barcelona chair.

See also
 Barcelona Pavilion
 Bauhaus
 List of chairs
 List of furniture designers
 Ludwig Mies van der Rohe
 X-chair

References

 Sourcebook of Modern Furniture, Third Edition, Jerryll Habegger and Joseph H Osman
 Miles van der Rohe, Aurora Cuito and Cristina Montes
 Bauhaus, Hans Engels and Ulf Meyer
 Modernism - designing a new world, Christopher Wilk, V&A p. 155
 Oxford Dictionary of Modern Design, Jonathan Woodham

External links

1929 in art
Ludwig Mies van der Rohe furniture
Chairs
Products introduced in 1929
Individual models of furniture